Legally Blonde may refer to:

 Legally Blonde, 2001 film
 Legally Blonde (soundtrack)
 Legally Blonde (novel) by  Amanda Brown, upon which the 2001 film was based
 Legally Blonde 2: Red, White & Blonde, 2003 sequel to Legally Blonde
 Legally Blondes, 2009 a spin-off version of Legally Blonde
 Legally Blonde (musical), 2007 stage musical
 Legally Blonde (2003 film), a 2003 TV film starring Jennifer Hall
 Legally Blonde: The Musical – The Search for Elle Woods, 2008 reality show to cast the lead role of Elle Woods for Legally Blonde: The Musical
 Legally Blonde (franchise)